Parce (pronounced par-say) is a brand of rum from Colombia.

History

Parce was founded by Jim Powers and his two brothers Patrick and Brian in 2012. Previously all from Chicago, Jim was living in New York City and working in A&R while Brian was living in Vail, Colorado. Patrick had been in Colombia since the 1990s to expand the family's water, oil and gas pipeline business. The brothers all met in Colombia three months after their dad died in 2010. They decided to make a sipping rum in honor of their father. The brothers employed Arthur Fernandes and Brojen Domecq Fernandes as master blenders. 

Parce debuted at the Pitchfork Music Festival in Chicago in 2014. Distribution began in Illinois, New York, Washington, Kansas, and Arkansas and sold 25,000 750-milliliter bottles in its first 18 months in operation. Parce also began shipping to France, Germany, and South Korea shortly thereafter.

Production

While Parce Rum the company is based in Chicago, Illinois, it is distilled in Pesé, Panama. It uses sugar cane harvested from Colombia, Trinidad, and Panama. Once distilled, it is then shipped to Colombia, where it is blended, racked, and aged.

References

External links 
 Parce Rum website

Colombian brands
Distilled drinks
Rums